Arthropleuridea is an extinct subclass of myriapod arthropods that flourished during the Carboniferous period, having first arose during the Silurian, and perishing in the Early Permian. Members are characterized by possessing diplosegement (fused "double segments", as in modern-day millipedes) paranotal tergal lobes separated from the body axis by a suture, and by sclerotized plates buttressing the leg insertions. Despite their unique features,  recent phylogenetic research suggests Arthropleuridea be included among millipedes in the class Diplopoda. The subclass contains three recognized orders, each with a single genus.

Paleobiology
Arthropleurids lived in the moist coal swamps that were common at the time and may have burrowed in the undergrowth. They were either herbivores or detritivores. Besides their size, their most distinguishing features were their legs with eight segments (as many as 30 pairs) and extremely tough exoskeletons. There is no evidence of spiracles, so the animals must have used lungs or gills for respiration.

Most arthropleurideans are thought to have been terrestrial, although, without any known respiratory structure, terrestriality is assumed only by analogy to modern arthropods. Early forms, however, including Eoarthropleura (order Eoarthropleurida), appear to have been aquatic. For this reason, some question Arthropleuridea's inclusion among millipedes because no modern aquatic myriapods are known.

Distribution and size
Arthropleuridea is most famous for Arthropleura (order Arthropleurida). Tracks from Arthropleura up to 50 cm wide have been found at Joggins, Nova Scotia. Reaching over 2 meters in length, arthropleurids are among the largest arthropods ever to have lived. The lack of large terrestrial vertebrate predators and the highly oxygenic atmosphere at that time probably enabled them to grow so large. It was previously believed that Arthropleura became extinct as the coal swamps dried out. However, many fossils have been discovered after the Carboniferous rainforest collapse. A more recent proposal is that predation by tetrapods and the aridification of the equator caused it to become extinct. Arthropleura has been found from the Upper Carboniferous of Europe and North America.

Eoarthropleura has been found from the Upper Silurian through the Upper Devonian of Europe and North America.

Microdecemplex, of the order Microdecemplicida, was dwarfed by the other Arthropleurideans, at just a few millimeters long. The genus is known from the Middle through Upper Devonian of New York state, USA.

Classification and placement

After several decades of uncertainty, Arthropleuridea was placed within the Diplopoda in the year 2000. However, there is still controversy regarding the relationships of the three orders to living millipede groups.  Some authors place Arthropleuridea within the Chilognatha, as a sister group to all living Chilognathan millipedes (Pentazonia + Helminthomorpha). An alternate hypothesis breaks up the subclass: placing the orders Arthropleurida and Eoarthropleurida within the basal Penicillata (as sister to the living Polyxenida), and leaving only Microdecemplicida as a sister group to the living Chilognatha.  Under this hypothesis, Arthropleuridea would be paraphyletic.

See also
 Archipolypoda, another extinct group of millipedes including the earliest known air-breathing animal
 Euthycarcinoidea, a group of enigmatic arthropods that may be ancestral to myriapods
 Colonization of land, major evolutionary stages leading to terrestrial organisms

References

Millipede taxonomy
Arthropod subclasses
Prehistoric arthropod taxa
Carboniferous myriapods
Devonian myriapods
Silurian myriapods
Pridoli first appearances